Sinapis is a genus of plants in the family Brassicaceae. , six species are recognised by The Plant List:
Sinapis alba L. – white mustard, formerly Brassica alba
Sinapis allionii Jacq.
Sinapis arvensis L. — charlock mustard, field mustard, wild mustard, charlock
Sinapis circinata Desf.
Sinapis flexuosa Poir.
Sinapis pubescens L.

References

External links

Brassicaceae
Brassicaceae genera